Wojtyła is  Polish-language surname. It arose from the nickname which is a diminutive for the given name Wojciech. Notable people with this surname include:

 Karol Wojtyła, later Pope John Paul II
 Emilia Wojtyła, mother of Karol Wojtyła
 Karol Wojtyła, father of Karol Wojtyła

See also
 Bari Karol Wojtyła Airport

References

Polish-language surnames